Maria Angela Caterina d'Este (1 March 1656 – 16 July 1722) was an Italian-born Princess of Modena who was later the Princess of Carignano by marriage. She was the wife of Emmanuel Philibert of Savoy, Prince of Carignano. In France she was known as Angélique Catherine d'Este and in Modena and Savoy she was known as Maria Caterina d'Este.

Biography

Born to the General Borso d'Este and his wife Ippolita d'Este, Maria Angela Caterina was the product of a marriage between niece and uncle, her father being a son of Cesare d'Este, Duke of Modena, and her mother a daughter of Prince Luigi d'Este, younger son of Cesare. As a member of the House of Este, she was a princess of Modena by birth, her father being the "founder" of a collateral line of the House of Este, the short lived House of Este-Scandiano. She was named after her paternal aunt, Princess Eleonora, who became a nun under the name of Sor Angela Caterina.

The youngest of seven children, she never knew her parents as her mother died shortly after her birth, while her father died a year later. After the death of their parents, Maria Angela and her siblings were put under the care of their grandfather/uncle, Prince Luigi. Her first cousins included Francesco I d'Este, Duke of Modena, Margherita d'Este (wife of the Duke of Guastalla) and the Duke of Mirandola. She was also a cousin of Isabella and Maria d'Este, two successive Duchesses of Parma.

The unmarried princess was noted for her good looks and for having such a fine figure for one of her age at the time of her marriage.

Despite the permission of Victor Amadeus, Duke of Savoy, Emmanuel Philibert's cousin and ruler of Savoy Emmanuel Philibert had expressed his wishes to marry Maria Angela Caterina. Emmanuel Philibert was the son of the late Thomas Francis, Prince of Carignano and his French born wife, the domineering Marie de Bourbon. His sister was the Dowager Hereditary Princess of Baden-Baden, mother of the famous General Türkenlouis.

The match was greatly opposed by France, then under the rule of Louis XIV, as Louis XIV had wanted Emmanuel Philibert to marry a French princess as Emmanuel Philibert was the heir presumptive to the Duchy of Savoy.

A proxy ceremony took place in Modena, in which her unmarried brother Caesare Ignace d'Este acted as her husband to be. A private ceremony took place on 10 November 1684 at the Castle of Racconigi, the summer residence of the Princes of Carignano; the bride being 28 and the groom 56.

This wedding was important to the House of Savoy, but very poorly viewed by the kingdom of France for its lack of political connection. Louis subsequently banished Emmanuel Philibert and his new spouse from the French court.

Maria Angela's grandfather had accepted the offer of marriage as he and Emmanuel Philibert had had good relations.

Her husband died in 1709 making Maria Angela Caterina the dowager princess of Carignano. Her only surviving son Victor Amadeus succeeded as Prince of Carignano. She died at the age of 66.

Issue
Maria Angela and her husband had four children. Their youngest child, Thomas Philippe, died young and unmarried:

Princess Maria Isabella of Savoy (14 March 1687 – 2 May 1767) 
Princess Maria Vittoria of Savoy (12 February 1688 – 18 May 1763) 
Prince Victor Amadeus of Savoy, (1 March 1690 – 4 April 1741) 
Prince Thomas Philippe Geatano of Savoy (10 May 1692 – 12 Sep 1715)

Ancestry

References and notes

External links

1656 births
1722 deaths
17th-century Italian nobility
18th-century Italian people
17th-century Italian women
18th-century Italian women
Maria Angela Caterina
Maria Angela Caterina
Maria Angela Caterina
Maria Angela Caterina